Veneer may refer to:

Materials
 Veneer (dentistry), a cosmetic treatment for teeth
 Masonry veneer, a thin facing layer of brick
 Stone veneer, a thin facing layer of stone
 Wood veneer, a thin facing layer of wood

Arts and entertainment
 Veneer (album), by José González, 2003
 Veneer (EP), by September Girls, 2014
 "Veneer", a song by the Verve Pipe from Villains
 Veneer Magazine, an annual art publication

See also
 Veneer theory, a term coined by Dutch primatologist Frans de Waal to label the Hobbesian view of human morality
 Vernier (disambiguation)